Louis Girard may refer to:

 Louis J. Girard, helped to popularize contact lens fitting
 Louis Dominique Girard (1815–1871), French hydraulic engineer